Nigel Paul Farage (born 3 April 1964) is a British broadcaster and former politician who was Leader of the UK Independence Party (UKIP) from 2006 to 2009 and 2010 to 2016 and Leader of the Brexit Party (renamed Reform UK in 2021) from 2019 to 2021. He was Member of the European Parliament (MEP) for South East England from 1999 until the United Kingdom's exit from the EU in 2020. He was the host of The Nigel Farage Show, a radio phone-in on the Global-owned talk radio station LBC, from 2017 to 2020. Farage is currently the Honorary President of Reform UK and a presenter for GB News.

Known as a prominent Eurosceptic since the early 1990s, Farage campaigned for the United Kingdom's withdrawal from the European Union. Farage was a founding member of UKIP, having left the Conservative Party in 1992 after the signing of the Maastricht Treaty, which furthered European integration and founded the European Union. After campaigning unsuccessfully in European and Westminster parliamentary elections from 1994, he was elected MEP for South East England in the 1999 European Parliament election. He was re-elected in the 2004, 2009, 2014 and 2019 European Parliament elections. In the European Parliament, he was the President of Europe of Freedom and Direct Democracy (EFDD) where he was noted for his speeches, and as a vocal critic of the euro currency.

He became the leader of UKIP in September 2006, and led the party through the 2009 European elections, when it won the second-highest share of the UK popular vote, with over 2 million votes. He stepped down in November 2009 to focus on contesting Buckingham, the constituency of the Speaker, John Bercow, at the 2010 general election, and came third. Farage successfully stood in the November 2010 UKIP leadership contest, becoming leader once again after Lord Malcolm Pearson voluntarily stepped down. He was ranked second in The Daily Telegraph Top 100 most influential right-wingers poll in 2013, behind Prime Minister David Cameron. Farage was named "Briton of the Year" by The Times in 2014. In the 2014 European elections, UKIP won 24 seats, the first time a party other than Labour or Conservative had won the largest number of seats in a national election since the December 1910 general election, pressuring Cameron to call a referendum on EU membership.

In the 2015 general election, UKIP secured over 3.8 million votes and 12.6% of the total vote, replacing the Liberal Democrats as the third most popular party, but secured only one seat. Farage announced his resignation when he did not win the South Thanet seat, but his resignation was rejected and he remained as leader. Farage was a prominent figure in the successful campaign for Brexit in the 2016 EU membership referendum. After the vote to leave the EU, Farage resigned as leader of UKIP, triggering a leadership election, but remained as an MEP. In December 2018, Farage stood down from UKIP. He returned to frontline politics by launching the Brexit Party in 2019. Drawing support from those frustrated with the delayed implementation of Brexit by Theresa May's government, the Brexit Party won the most votes in the May 2019 European elections, becoming the largest single party in the European Parliament.

Early life
Farage was born in Farnborough, Kent, England, the son of Barbara (née Stevens) and Guy Justus Oscar Farage. His father was a stockbroker who worked in the City of London. A 2012 BBC Radio 4 profile described Guy Farage as an alcoholic who left the family home when Nigel was five years old. His father gave up alcohol two years later, in 1971, and entered the antiques trade, having lost his Stock Exchange position; the next year, endorsed by friends, he returned to the trading floor at the new Stock Exchange Tower on Threadneedle Street. Farage's grandfather, Harry Farage, was a private who fought and was wounded in the First World War. It has been suggested that the Farage name comes from a distant Huguenot ancestor. Both parents of one of Farage's great-grandfathers were German who emigrated to London from the Frankfurt area shortly after 1861. His German ancestor Nicholas Schrod was mentioned in the papers in 1870 in connection with a dispute with two men over the Franco-Prussian War.

From 1975 to 1982 Farage was educated at Dulwich College, a fee-paying private school in south London. In his autobiography he pays tribute to the careers advice he received there from England Test cricketer John Dewes, "who must have spotted that I was quite ballsy, probably good on a platform, unafraid of the limelight, a bit noisy and good at selling things". Farage was active in the Conservative Party from his school days, having seen a visit to his school by Enoch Powell and Keith Joseph. In 1981, an English teacher who had not met the 17-year-old Farage, Chloe Deakin, wrote to the headmaster of Dulwich College, David Emms, asking him to reconsider his decision to appoint Farage as a prefect, citing concerns expressed by others over Farage's alleged 'fascist' views. Emms rejected those concerns, as did the College's deputy headmaster, Terry Walsh, who said later that Farage "was well-known for provoking people, especially left-wing English teachers who had no sense of humour." Farage later stated that some teachers were hostile to him because he was an admirer of Enoch Powell, and said: "Any accusation I was ever involved in far right politics is utterly untrue."

Early career
After leaving school in 1982, Farage obtained employment in the City of London, trading commodities at the London Metal Exchange. Initially, he joined the American commodity operation of brokerage firm Drexel Burnham Lambert, transferring to Crédit Lyonnais Rouse in 1986. He joined Refco in 1994, and Natixis Metals in 2003.

Farage joined the Conservative Party in 1978, but voted for the Green Party in 1989 because of what he saw as their then "sensible" and Eurosceptic policies. He left the Conservatives in 1992 in protest at Prime Minister John Major's government's signing of the Treaty on European Union at Maastricht.

European Parliament
Farage was elected to the European Parliament in 1999 and re-elected in 2004, 2009 and 2014. The BBC spent four months filming a documentary about his European election campaign in 1999, but did not air it. Farage, then head of the UKIP's South East office, asked for a video and had friends make copies which were sold for £5 through the UKIP's magazine. Surrey Trading Standards investigated and Farage admitted the offence. Farage was the leader of the 24-member UKIP contingent in the European Parliament, and co-leader of the multinational Eurosceptic group, Europe of Freedom and Direct Democracy. Farage was ranked the fifth-most influential MEP by Politico in 2016, who described him as "one of the two most effective speakers in the chamber". Reportedly, he would always be assigned office number 007 in the European Parliament.

On 18 November 2004 Farage announced in the European Parliament that Jacques Barrot, then French Commissioner-designate, had been barred from elected office in France for two years, after being convicted in 2000 of embezzling £2 million from government funds and diverting it into the coffers of his party. He said that French President Jacques Chirac had granted Barrot amnesty; initial BBC reports said that, under French law, it was perhaps illegal to mention that conviction. The prohibition in question applies only to French officials in the course of their duties. The President of the Parliament, Josep Borrell, enjoined him to retract his comments under threat of "legal consequences". The following day, it was confirmed that Barrot had received an eight-month suspended jail sentence in the case, and that this had been quickly expunged by the amnesty decided by Chirac and his parliamentary majority.

In early 2005 Farage requested that the European Commission disclose where the individual Commissioners had spent their holidays. The Commission did not provide the information requested, on the basis that the Commissioners had a right of privacy. The German newspaper Die Welt reported that the President of the European Commission, José Manuel Barroso, had spent a week on the yacht of the Greek shipping billionaire Spiros Latsis. It emerged soon afterwards that this had occurred a month before the Commission under Barroso's predecessor Romano Prodi approved 10.3 million euros of Greek state aid for Latsis's shipping company. It also became known that Peter Mandelson, then the British EU Commissioner, had accepted a trip to Jamaica from an unrevealed source at a debate on 26 May 2005. The motion was heavily defeated. A Conservative MEP, Roger Helmer, was expelled from his group, the European People's Party – European Democrats (EPP-ED), in the middle of the debate by that group's leader Hans-Gert Pöttering as a result of his support for Farage's motion.

Farage persuaded around 75 MEPs from across the political divide to back a motion of no confidence in Barroso, which would be sufficient to compel Barroso to appear before the European Parliament to be questioned on the issue. The motion was successfully tabled on 12 May 2005, and Barroso appeared before Parliament.

In 2013 Farage criticised Barroso's former membership in the Maoist Portuguese Workers' Communist Party, saying: "You are a man that likes fixed ideology, you probably picked it up when you were a communist or Maoist, or whatever you were, and for the last ten years you've pursued euro-federalism combined with an increasing green obsession."

After the speech of Herman Van Rompuy on 24 February 2010 to the European Parliament, Farage – to protests from other MEPs – addressed the former Prime Minister of Belgium and first long-term President of the European Council, saying that he had the "charisma of a damp rag" and the appearance of "a low grade bank clerk". Farage questioned the legitimacy of Van Rompuy's appointment, asking, "Who are you? I'd never heard of you, nobody in Europe had ever heard of you." He also asserted that Van Rompuy's "intention [is] to be the quiet assassin of European democracy and of the European nation states". Van Rompuy commented afterwards, "There was one contribution that I can only hold in contempt, but I'm not going to comment further." After refusing to apologise for behaviour that was, in the words of the President of the European Parliament, Jerzy Buzek, "inappropriate, unparliamentary and insulting to the dignity of the House", Farage was reprimanded and had his right to ten days' allowance (expenses) "docked".

Buzek said after his meeting with Farage:

I defend absolutely Mr Farage's right to disagree about the policy or institutions of the Union, but not to personally insult our guests in the European Parliament or the country from which they may come... I myself fought for free speech as the absolute cornerstone of a democratic society. But with freedom comes responsibility – in this case, to respect the dignity of others and of our institutions. I am disappointed by Mr Farage's behaviour, which sits ill with the great parliamentary tradition of his own country. I cannot accept this sort of behaviour in the European Parliament. I invited him to apologise, but he declined to do so. I have therefore – as an expression of the seriousness of the matter – rescinded his right to ten days' daily allowance as a Member.

Questioned by Camilla Long of The Times, Farage described his speech: "it wasn't abusive, it was right."

Charles, Prince of Wales was invited to speak to the European Parliament on 14 February 2008; in his speech he called for EU leadership in the battle against climate change. During the standing ovation that followed, Farage was the only MEP to remain seated, and he went on to describe the Prince's advisers as "naïve and foolish at best."

In May 2009 The Observer reported a Foreign Press Association speech given by Farage in which he had said that over his ten years as a Member of the European Parliament he had received a total of £2 million of taxpayers' money in staff, travel, and other expenses. In response, Farage said that in future all UKIP MEPs would provide monthly expense details.

In a second visit to Edinburgh in May 2014 Farage correctly predicted that UKIP would win a Scottish seat in the European Parliament elections. Two hundred protesters heckled and booed him. Thirty police in two vans were needed to preserve order.

In the European Parliament elections in 2014, Farage led UKIP to win the highest share of the vote. It was the first time a political party other than the Labour Party and Conservative Party had won the popular vote in a national election since the 1906 general election. It was also the first time a party other than the Labour and Conservatives won the largest number of seats in a national election since the December 1910 general election.

In June 2014 Farage declared £205,603 for gifts over ten years, including free use of a barn for his constituency office, which had been declared in the EU register in Brussels each year. The Electoral Commission said that the gifts should have been also declared in the UK within 30 days of receipt and fined Farage £200.

In early November 2014, just days after becoming head of the European Commission, the former Prime Minister of Luxembourg Jean-Claude Juncker was hit by media disclosures—derived from a document leak known as Luxembourg Leaks—that Luxembourg under his premiership had turned into a major European centre of corporate tax avoidance. A subsequent motion of censure in the European Parliament was brought against Juncker over his role in the tax avoidance schemes. The motion was defeated by a large majority. Farage was one of the main drivers behind the censure motion.

UK Independence Party

1993–2010

Farage was a founder member of UKIP in 1993. On 12 September 2006 he was elected leader of UKIP with 45 percent of the vote, 20 percentage points ahead of his nearest rival. He pledged to bring discipline to the party and to maximise UKIP's representation in local, parliamentary and other elections. In a PM programme interview on BBC Radio 4 that day he pledged to end the public perception of UKIP as a single-issue party and to work with allied politicians in the Better Off Out campaign, committing himself not to stand against the MPs who have signed up to that campaign.

In his maiden speech to the UKIP conference, on 8 October 2006, Farage told delegates that the party was "at the centre-ground of British public opinion" and the "real voice of opposition". He said: "We've got three social democratic parties in Britain – Labour, Lib Dem and Conservative are virtually indistinguishable from each other on nearly all the main issues" and "you can't put a cigarette paper between them and that is why there are nine million people who don't vote now in general elections that did back in 1992."

At 10pm on 19 October 2006, Farage took part in a three-hour live interview and phone-in with James Whale on the national radio station talkSPORT. Four days later, Whale announced on his show his intention to stand as UKIP's candidate in the 2008 London Mayoral Election. Farage said that Whale "not only has guts, but an understanding of what real people think". Whale later decided not to stand and UKIP was represented by Gerard Batten.

2010 general election
On 4 September 2009 Farage resigned as UKIP's leader to focus on his campaign to become Member of Parliament for Buckingham at Westminster in the 2010 general election. He later told The Times journalist Camilla Long that UKIP internal fights took up far too much time.

Farage stood against sitting Buckingham MP, John Bercow, the newly elected Speaker of the House of Commons, despite the convention that the Speaker, as a political neutral, is not normally challenged in his or her bid for re-election by any of the major parties.

Farage came third with 8,401 votes. Bercow was re-elected and in second place with 10,331 votes was John Stevens, a former Conservative MEP who campaigned as an independent accompanied by "Flipper the Dolphin" (a reference to MPs – including Bercow – flipping second homes).

On 6 May 2010, the morning of the election, Farage was travelling in a two-seater PZL-104 Wilga aircraft with a pro-UKIP banner attached, when the plane crashed. Farage suffered injuries that were described as non-life-threatening. Although his injuries were originally described as minor, his sternum and ribs were broken and his lung punctured. The Air Accidents Investigation Branch (AAIB) report said that the aeroplane was towing a banner, which caught in the tailplane, forcing the nose down.

On 1 December 2010 Justin Adams, the pilot of the aircraft involved in the accident, was charged with threatening to kill Farage in a separate incident. He was also charged with threatening to kill an AAIB official involved in the investigation into the accident. In April 2011, the pilot was found guilty of making death threats. The judge said that the defendant was "clearly extremely disturbed" at the time the offences happened, adding: "He is a man who does need help. If I can find a way of giving him help I will." Adams was given a two-year supervised community order, and in December 2013 was found dead at home in circumstances that police said were "not being treated as suspicious".

2010–2015
Farage stood again for the UKIP leadership in 2010 after his successor Lord Pearson had stood down, and on 5 November 2010 it was announced he had won the leadership contest.

UKIP forgot to put its party name on its candidate's ballot paper for the 2012 London mayoral election, Laurence Webb appearing as "a fresh choice for London". Farage described the mistake as an internal error. Interviewed the following Sunday by Andrew Neil and asked about "the game plan", Farage welcomed the "average 13% vote" across the country, and stated that the party was preparing for county council elections in 2013, the European Parliament election in 2014 and a general election in 2015.

Asked what would happen to UKIP if the Conservatives made a manifesto commitment to a referendum on EU membership, Farage said they had already failed to honour a "cast iron" commitment to a referendum on the Lisbon Treaty. Farage said that UKIP aspired to come top of the European elections, but Neil suggested UKIP were still seen as "unprofessional, amateur and even unacceptable". In the same interview, Farage described Baroness Warsi as "the lowest grade Chairman the Tory Party has ever had". He was voted politician of the year by the online service MSN.

In May 2013 Farage led UKIP to its best performance in a UK election. The party received 23 per cent of the vote in the local elections, winning 147 council seats, and placing it only 2 points behind the governing Conservative Party and 9 points ahead of the Liberal Democrats. Farage was mobbed by well-wishers as he made his way to his favourite pub, the Marquis of Granby, for a celebratory drink. He called the victory "a real sea change in British politics". Subsequently, polling agency Survation found that 22 per cent of voters intended to support UKIP in the 2015 General Election.

In May 2013 Farage was interrupted by protesters during a press conference in the Canon's Gait pub on Edinburgh's Royal Mile. The demonstration was organised by groups including the Radical Independence Campaign and saw protesters vocally accuse Farage of being "racist", "fascist", and a "homophobe", and tell him to "go back to London". Farage made attempts to leave by taxi but was prevented from doing so, and was eventually taken away in an armoured police van while protesters continued to shout. He was trying to raise the profile of UKIP in Scotland ahead of the Aberdeen Donside by-election; the party at that point had no representation in the country, and took 0.91 per cent of the vote in the previous election though it won its first Scottish MEP the following year. During an interview with BBC's Good Morning Scotland radio show, Farage cut short the exchange, stating that the questions regarding the incident in Edinburgh were insulting and unpleasant.

Farage said in 2013 that he had hired a tax advisor to set up the Farage Family Educational Trust 1654, a trust that Farage said was used "for inheritance purposes", on the Isle of Man. Farage later described this "as standard practice", but stated he "decided I didn't want it. I never ever used it. The Isle of Man is not a tax haven." Farage has since said that this was a mistake: that he was "not rich enough" to need it, that what was seen to be fair 10, 20 or 30 years ago wasn't anymore, and that it cost him money. He has criticised the political discourse surrounding tax avoidance as a "race to the bottom". The BBC reported: "The Isle of Man was one of the UK's crown dependencies which signed an agreement on corporate disclosure at a recent meeting with David Cameron amid claims that individuals and firms are using offshore locations to reduce their tax liabilities", adding that the Isle of Man rejects any allegations that they are used for the purpose of tax avoidance.

Farage had previously denounced tax avoidance in a speech to the European Parliament in which he criticised European bureaucrats who earned £100,000 a year and paid 12 per cent tax under EU rules, Farage said in 2014 that "most legal forms of tax avoidance are ok, but clearly some are not" after he was questioned on why £45,000 of his income was paid into his private company rather than a personal bank account, and that criticism of his actions was "ridiculous". In the wake of the Panama Papers leak, Farage said that the possibility of him releasing his tax return was a "big no" as "I think in this country what people earn is regarded as a private matter", and criticised David Cameron as hypocritical, especially with regard to his past comments about Jimmy Carr's tax avoidance.

Farage has continued to have fees paid to him via a limited company, Thorn in the Side Ltd.

On 12 September 2014, he appeared at a pro-union rally with Scottish UKIP MEP David Coburn ahead of Scotland's independence referendum.

2015 general election
In October 2013 Farage announced on the BBC's The Andrew Marr Show that he would stand for election as an MP at the 2015 United Kingdom general election, most likely contesting either Folkestone and Hythe or South Thanet; meanwhile he stated that his duty and preference was to focus on his current role as an MEP.

In August 2014 Farage was selected as the UKIP candidate for South Thanet following local hustings.

In October 2014 Farage was invited to take part in prospective Leaders' debates on BBC, ITV, Channel 4 and Sky ahead of the 2015 general election. UKIP indicated that it would consider taking legal action were the party excluded, in contravention of established broadcast media rules, from televised Leaders' debates in advance of the election. The 7-way Leaders' TV debate was broadcast by ITV on 2 April 2015 from MediaCityUK, Salford Quays. Of three polls taken immediately afterwards, the ComRes poll had Farage as joint winner, alongside Labour's Ed Miliband and Conservative David Cameron.

In March 2015 Farage declared in his book The Purple Revolution that he would step down as UKIP leader should he not be elected as an MP; he stated his belief that it would not be "credible" for him to lead UKIP without sitting in parliament at Westminster.

On 22 March 2015 Farage was targeted by anti-UKIP activists who chased him and his family from a pub lunch in Downe, Greater London. His daughters ran away to hide and were later found to be safe. Farage, when asked what he thought about the incident, called the protesters "scum".

Farage was unsuccessful in his bid to become MP for South Thanet although he came second (beating Labour by over 4,000 votes), reduced the Conservative majority to less than 3,000, and gained over 32% of the vote.

Farage subsequently announced his resignation as the leader of UKIP, citing that he is a "man of his word" since he promised to resign if he did not win his seat, although he kept open the possibility of re-entering the ensuing leadership contest. On 11 May 2015 it was announced that Farage would continue to serve as the party's leader, with the BBC reporting: "Party chairman Steve Crowther said the national executive committee believed the election campaign had been a 'great success' and members had 'unanimously' rejected Mr Farage's letter of resignation". Interviewed about his continued leadership by the BBC the following day, Farage said: "I resigned. I said I'd resign. I turned up to the NEC meeting with letter in hand fully intending to carry that through. They unanimously said they didn't want me to do that, they presented me with petitions, signatures, statements from candidates saying it would be a bad thing for UKIP. So I left the meeting, went and sat in darkened room to think about what to do, and decided for the interest of the party I would accept their kind offer for me to stay and tear up the letter." He added that he would consider standing for parliament again should a by-election be called in a Labour-held seat.

A row subsequently developed within the party, in which MEP and campaign chief Patrick O'Flynn described Farage's public image as "snarling, thin-skinned, aggressive" and said he risked turning the party into a "personality cult". O'Flynn accused Farage of paying too much attention to advisors that "would like to take UKIP in the direction of some hard-right, ultra-aggressive American Tea Party-type movement", singling out the NHS and gun control liberalisation as particular issues. Raheem Kassam, Farage's chief of staff and editor of Breitbart London was later sacked as a result, whilst O'Flynn stated that he continued to support Farage as party leader. Farage also faced a number of calls from senior figures within the party to stand down.

Following the election, a UKIP spokesman acknowledged that after a series of threatening attacks on Farage it had sent an informant into the Thanet branch of the protest organisation Stand Up to UKIP, stating "in order to provide reasonable security it was of course necessary to have information from the inside", an approach he said was used by "a great many security operations tasked with protecting the safety and wellbeing of a targeted individual". According to The Guardian, the informant is alleged to have actively encouraged members to commit criminal damage. Farage had said he was the victim of "trade union-funded activists" who were inciting vandalism.

Brexit

2016 referendum
Farage was a key figurehead in the Brexit campaign of 2016, which, with 52 per cent of the vote, won. Jean-Claude Juncker promptly told all UKIP members to leave the Parliament. During the campaign, Farage had made the suggestion of a future second referendum should the Brexit campaign be unsuccessful, but the result be closer than 52–48. Farage accused US President Barack Obama of a "monstrous interference" in the Brexit referendum debate, saying "You wouldn't expect the British Prime Minister to intervene in your presidential election; you wouldn't expect the Prime Minister to endorse one candidate or another."

Farage initially supported Vote Leave (led by Dominic Cummings and Matthew Elliott, supported by Boris Johnson and Michael Gove) and Leave.EU (led by Arron Banks) in their campaigns to leave the EU, saying that they reached "different audiences"; however, he later grew irritated at Vote Leave's marginalisation of the UKIP-backed Grassroots Out movement, and their lack of explicit focus on immigration as an issue. He blamed this on the senior "apparatchiks" within the party (i.e. Cummings and Elliott) who purposefully marginalised Farage during the campaign, believing his attitudes on immigration deterred swing voters. The Daily Telegraph quoted Farage as saying that: "[Cummings] has never liked me. He can't stand the ERG. I can't see him coming to any accommodation with anyone. He has huge personal enmity with the true believers in Brexit".

Farage has argued strongly in favour of a British Independence Day being observed within the United Kingdom, on 23 June each year. On 24 June 2016, in a televised speech on the morning of the Brexit result, he stated; "let 23 June go down in our history as our Independence Day", and later said that it "must now be made a national holiday."

2016–2019

On 28 June 2016 Farage made a speech in the European Parliament in which he stated that a hypothetical failure for the EU to forge a trade deal with an exiting UK would "be far worse for you than it would be for us", to heckling and laughing by Parliament members. He insulted his fellow MEPs, stating that "virtually none" of them had ever had done "a proper job" in their lives. Media around the world covered Farage's speech, including his comment: "... when I came here 17 years ago, and I said that I wanted to lead a campaign to get Britain to leave the European Union, you all laughed at me. Well I have to say, you're not laughing now are you?" and his prediction that Britain will not be the only country to leave the EU. In response, Guy Verhofstadt compared Farage's referendum posters with Nazi propaganda and credited the Brexit campaign with causing a multi-billion loss in the stock exchange. Explicitly addressing Farage, Verhofstadt added, "... Ok. Let's be positive. Finally, we're going to get rid of the biggest waste in the budget of the (European) Union, that we have paid for 17 years, your salary."

Farage resigned as leader of the United Kingdom Independence Party on 4 July 2016, saying that: "It's right that I should now stand aside as leader. What I said during the referendum campaign is I want my country back. What I'm saying today is I want my life back. And it begins right now" and "I have never been, and I have never wanted to be, a career politician." He added that this resignation was final: "I won't be changing my mind again, I can promise you", apparently referring to his two previous resignations (in 2009 and 2015). Jean-Claude Juncker, President of the European Commission, described Farage as a "retro-nationalist", Caroline Lucas, Green Party MP for Brighton Pavilion, said that his legacy is "toxic and unforgivable" and that "He has used his position to whip up hatred against migrants and divert attention from the real challenges this country is facing." Paul Nuttall, a UKIP MEP, tweeted that Farage's "drive and belief shook establishment politics to its core and gave us a voice" and Suzanne Evans, former Deputy Chairman of UKIP, said that Farage's resignation surprised her, but "there is room still in Britain for UKIP". Writing in The Spectator, after his resignation, the journalist Rod Liddle described Farage as: "The most important British politician of the last decade and the most successful. His resignation leaves a hole in our political system. With enormous intelligence and chutzpah and a refreshingly unorthodox approach, he built UKIP up from nothing to become established as our third largest party and succeeded in his overriding ambition – to see the UK vote to leave the European Union."

Following a legal challenge by Gina Miller to the use of the Royal Prerogative to invoke article 50, Farage appeared on The Andrew Marr Show with Miller. She stated that "politicians had lied all the way through" and that the Referendum act clearly said that the result was advisory. Farage accepted that it was advisory, but said afterwards "I just want to ask her – what part of the word 'leave' don't you understand?". Farage talked of a peaceful protest and warned of unprecedented political anger if Parliament blocked Brexit. Miller said that parliamentary democracy required parliament to debate issues and that Farage had spent the whole Brexit campaign arguing for parliamentary sovereignty. Calling his warnings "the politics of the gutter", Tim Farron said the British judges had merely interpreted British law and that fortunately Farage was the only person talking about taking to the streets. Miller has previously called Farage irresponsible and has blamed him and the tabloid media for death threats against her. She stated in November 2016 that she would not take legal action against those who had threatened her.

On 7 November 2016 Farage announced he would lead a 100,000 strong march to the Supreme Court, timed for when it started hearing the Government appeal. On 27 November 2016, it was reported the march was being cancelled out of concerns it could be hijacked by the far-right groups English Defence League and the British National Party. The next day, Paul Nuttall became the new UKIP party leader after Farage decided to step aside to strengthen his relationship with US President-elect Donald Trump.

In 2017 Farage called for the departure of UKIP's only MP, Douglas Carswell. He said in The Daily Telegraph: "I think there is little future for UKIP with him staying inside this party. The time for him to go is now." There was reportedly controversy within the party over whether Carswell had tried to prevent Farage receiving a knighthood. It was reported the MP had suggested Farage should instead be given an OBE "for services to headline writers".

On 20 April 2017 Farage announced that he would not contest the 2017 general election. He said that he believed he could further advance his version of Brexit as a leader of a group in the European Parliament.

In May 2018 Farage addressed a fundraising event for the Democratic Unionist Party, with his main financial backer, Arron Banks, who accompanied Farage during the event, stating that he would support a bid by Farage to seek office as a DUP candidate after the end of his tenure as Member of the European Parliament in 2019. In 2018 he joined Leave Means Leave as vice-chairman.

Brexit Party
On 4 December 2018 Farage announced "with a heavy heart" on his live LBC radio show that effective immediately he had resigned his membership of UKIP, after 25 years as a member of the party. In explanation, Farage mentioned UKIP leader Gerard Batten's appointment the previous month of far-right activist Tommy Robinson as an adviser and the National Executive of UKIP's voting in a no-confidence vote to keep Batten as leader of the party. Farage argued that Batten was "obsessed with the issue of Islam, not just Islamic extremism, but Islam, and UKIP wasn't founded to be a party fighting a religious crusade." He also said that association with Robinson damaged the image of Brexit.

On 8 February 2019 Reuters noted that the Brexit Party had been approved by the Electoral Commission and quoted Farage from an article he wrote in The Telegraph, stating that he would stand as a candidate for the party in any potential future European Parliament election contested in the United Kingdom. On 8 February 2019, the Financial Times quoted Farage as saying the new party was a "live vehicle" that could be "mobilised" if Brexit is delayed. On 13 February Farage confirmed he would sit in the European Parliament as a member of the Brexit Party. On 22 March he was announced as the new leader of the party after founder and former leader Catherine Blaiklock resigned.

On 14 May Conservative MP Crispin Blunt called for the government to go into an "electoral arrangement" with the Brexit Party to ensure Brexit was to happen on time. Asked by Huw Edwards if he would consider such a partnership, Farage said he would be willing to work with anyone to secure a deal that gets Britain out of the single market, customs union and European Court of Justice, but said that trust may be an issue, stating: "both main parties have let us down very badly".

In May 2019 British broadcaster Channel 4 News reported it had seen invoices for travel and accommodation expenses between summer 2016 and summer 2017. It further reported that these benefits, worth "as much as £450,000", were funded by Arron Banks, and were not declared on Farage's register of interests, which he should have done as a serving MEP. Liberal Democrat MEP Catherine Bearder, in her role as a quaestor (an MEP responsible for financial and administrative matters), raised the issue and this resulted in an official investigation opening on 21 May 2019. When asked by the BBC about the matter Farage replied, "Whatever happened after the referendum – I was leaving politics, it happened mostly in America, it had nothing to do with politics, nothing to do with the Brexit Party, it was purely on a personal basis. I was looking for a new career and a new life – it's got nothing to do with anything, it's a purely private matter."

On 20 May 2019, a Brexit opponent threw a milkshake at Farage in Newcastle upon Tyne. The assailant, who was arrested at the scene, accused Farage of "spouting bile and racism". Farage tweeted about the incident saying: "For a civilised democracy to work you need the losers' consent, politicians not accepting the referendum result have led us to this." A month later, 32-year-old Paul Crowther pleaded guilty to common assault and criminal damage at Tyneside Magistrates' Court, where District Judge Bernard Begley ordered him to carry out 150 hours of community service and pay £350 compensation to Farage.

In June 2019, Donald Trump suggested that Farage should be involved in the UK government's Brexit negotiations, because he had "a lot to offer".

In the 2019 European Parliament election, Farage led the Brexit Party to win 29 seats and the highest share of the vote. Among the party's MEPs that were elected were former Conservatives Ann Widdecombe and Annunziata Rees-Mogg.

Following Boris Johnson's becoming prime minister, Farage unveiled the names of 635 general election candidates for the Brexit Party, including himself. He later announced that he would not be standing as a candidate.

On 8 September 2019, Farage said that the Brexit Party should be given "a free run" at targeting traditional Labour voters in the North of England, Midlands and Wales by the Conservative Party as part of an electoral pact. According to The Sunday Telegraph, he did not want the Brexit Party to face Conservative opposition in constituencies such as Wansbeck and West Bromwich East and in return the Brexit Party would not contest seats where the leave vote was at risk of splitting. Farage said that his party and the Conservatives "together would be unstoppable".

On 11 September, a senior Conservative source said that Farage was "not a fit and proper person" and "should never be allowed anywhere near government". The government confirmed that Boris Johnson would not form an electoral pact with Farage, to which he said he was "disappointed" as he was offering a "genuine hand of friendship". The Brexit Party gained 642,303 votes in the election but no seats.

In January 2020, the Greater London Authority granted Leave Means Leave permission to hold a party in Parliament Square on the night the UK left the EU. Farage told the crowd celebrating the occasion on 31 January that "what happens now marks the point of no return. We are never going back". Other speakers included the businessman Tim Martin, politician Peter Bone and broadcaster Julia Hartley-Brewer. Before the party, Farage expressed support for Big Ben to chime to mark the moment at 11 pm GMT.

In December 2020, Farage celebrated the EU–UK Trade and Cooperation Agreement, following the agreement's announcement, stating that the "war is over."

Post-Brexit career
During the early stages of the COVID-19 pandemic in the United Kingdom, Farage wrote "protecting us all from an epidemic should be prioritised over the economy", and criticised the herd immunity policy pursued at the time by Boris Johnson's government. When Johnson's strategy changed and the UK introduced various lockdown measures to control the disease, Farage said in November 2020 he thought "the cure is worse than the disease" and announced the Brexit Party would rebrand as Reform UK and campaign against further lockdowns.

Farage described lockdown as "cruel and unnecessary" and endorsed the Great Barrington Declaration, which advocates focused protection of those most vulnerable to COVID-19 with the majority of the population allowed to resume normal life. The approach was conceived by Sunetra Gupta, a professor of theoretical epidemiology at the University of Oxford, as well as Jay Bhattacharya of Stanford University and Martin Kulldorff of Harvard University. The scientists were concerned with lockdown's effects on public health and mental health, especially for the underprivileged, which they described as "devastating". However, the approach has been criticised by Tedros Adhanom, the director-general of the World Health Organization, and Robert Lechler, the president of the British Academy of Medical Sciences.

In 2020, Farage established a financial newsletter, Fortune and Freedom, which describes itself as "unregulated product published by Southbank Investment Research Limited". On 28 March 2021 Dutch Green Business announced Farage had been appointed to the firm's advisory board. The newsletter discusses issues related to pension investments.

On 6 March 2021 Farage announced in an interview with The Telegraph that he was retiring from politics and resigning as leader of Reform UK. He became the party's honorary president.

In July 2021 Farage criticised the Royal National Lifeboat Institution, accusing them of being a "taxi service" for illegal immigrants. This provoked a major public backlash – donations to the service rose 3000% in the wake of the remarks and a fundraiser on GoFundMe raised over £120,000 to purchase a new rescue hovercraft for the charity with a suggestion the boat be christened The Flying Farage. In November 2021 Farage published an op-ed in The Daily Telegraph contemplating a return to frontline politics, due to the English Channel migrant crossings and what he perceived as the Prime Minister's indifference to the issue.

Farage has been making videos on the Cameo platform, and has fallen victim to several pranks intended to make him refer to various Irish republican slogans.

Farage launched the Vote Power Not Poverty campaign to secure a referendum on Johnson's government's pledge to achieve net zero carbon emissions by 2050.

In September 2022, Farage introduced a range of three gins made in Cornwall.

Involvement in politics outside the UK

United States

2016 presidential election

In a May 2016 interview with Robert Peston, Farage said that, whilst he had reservations on the views and character of 2016 Republican presidential candidate Donald Trump, if he were an eligible US voter he would vote for Trump in the 2016 presidential election, to prevent Hillary Clinton becoming president. In July 2016, Farage visited the Republican convention in Cleveland with his aide and office manager George Cottrell. Both Farage and Cottrell appeared on American television and engaged in discussions with Trump's aides before Cottrell was arrested by the FBI on 21 federal counts of fraud, money laundering and extortion. Farage "was unaware of Cottrell's alleged illegal activities and his arrest by the FBI came as a shock." Cottrell's arrest left Farage unable to access his personal diary. Cottrell ultimately pleaded guilty to one count of wire fraud as part of a plea agreement with U.S. federal prosecutors and was sentenced to eight months in U.S. federal prison and was fined $30,000; the crime had been committed before Cottrell joined UKIP.

In August 2016 Farage and fellow Brexiteers Andy Wigmore and Arron Banks met Trump for the first time at a high-dollar campaign fundraiser in Jackson, Mississippi. They were invited to the event by staffers for Mississippi governor Phil Bryant while attending the GOP convention. Afterwards, Trump invited them to his campaign rally that night. Trump asked Farage to speak at the rally and introduced him to the crowd as "Mr. Brexit".

In October 2016 Farage praised Trump for "dominating" Hillary Clinton, comparing him to a silverback gorilla. Following revelations of a 2005 audio recording in which Trump made lewd remarks about women, Farage said that Trump's comments were "ugly" but described them as "alpha male boasting" also stating that Trump was "not running to be Pope" and that women also make remarks they would not want to see reported. Farage's comments prompted several senior UKIP members to express concern privately, and resulted in public criticism of Farage from two UKIP MEPs, Jane Collins and William Dartmouth. As more publicity appeared about Trump's alleged groping and as the criticisms increased, Farage said he disagreed with Trump's comments about groping women and his comments on Muslim immigration.

Farage is reported to have had close links with Trump's then chief strategist, Steve Bannon, since at least 2014, when Bannon scheduled meetings for Farage with right-wing figures in Washington. In his book, The Purple Revolution: The Year That Changed Everything, Farage described Bannon as "my sort of chap."

After Trump's victory, Farage said that he "couldn't be happier" and in the same interview referred to outgoing president Barack Obama as a "loathsome individual" and "that Obama creature", remarks which prompted criticism. Labour MP John Woodcock criticised Farage's comments, saying they had "clear racist undertones." Farage was the first British politician to speak to Trump after his election, meeting with Trump in his eponymous Manhattan tower.

Farage was listed as a person of interest by the FBI in their investigation into possible Russian interference in the 2016 presidential election. Farage responded, "This hysterical attempt to associate me with the Putin regime is a result of the liberal elite being unable to accept Brexit and the election of President Trump... I consider it extremely doubtful that I could be a person of interest to the FBI as I have no connections to Russia."

In November 2016, after becoming president-elect, Trump publicly suggested, via Twitter post, that the UK government name Farage as British ambassador to the United States. Trump's expression of a preference for a foreign nation's ambassador was "a startling break with diplomatic protocol" that was unprecedented in recent US history. The British government rejected the suggestion, with a Downing Street spokesman and then-Foreign Secretary Boris Johnson stressing that there was no vacancy in the position.

Trump presidency

Since April 2018 Farage has been a strong advocate for U.S. President Donald Trump to receive the Nobel Peace Prize on the basis of his attempt to bring better diplomatic relations between North Korea and South Korea as well as better diplomatic relations between North Korea and the United States. As a member of the European Parliament, Farage expressed his desire to begin an official petition for Trump to receive the award.

Farage endorsed Roy Moore in the United States Senate special election in Alabama. After numerous allegations of sexual misconduct were made against Moore, Farage publicly expressed his scepticism over the allegations. In May 2018, he expressed regret for having backed Moore, stating, "I should have thought about the whole thing far more deeply than I did, and it was a mistake."

In July 2018 Farage headlined a fundraiser for Lou Barletta, the Republican nominee in the 2018 United States Senate election in Pennsylvania.

In October 2017 Farage made controversial remarks during a discussion on LBC radio station after a caller who referred to himself as "Ahmed" told Farage he thought the pro-Israeli lobby in the United States was equally dangerous to the Russian interference in American politics. Farage responded by saying: "the Israeli lobby, you know, that's a reasonable point, Ahmed, because there are about 6 million Jewish people living in America, so as a percentage it's quite small, but in terms of influence it's quite big...in terms of money and influence, yep, they are a very powerful lobby," and "there are other very powerful foreign lobbies in the United States of America, and the Jewish lobby, with its links with the Israeli government, is one of those strong voices." Farage's remarks were condemned by the Campaign Against Antisemitism and the Anti-Defamation League, which said that Farage's comment "plays into deep-seated anti-Semitic tropes" and was fuel for extremist conspiracy theories.

Since 2020
After gaining no seats in the 2019 UK general election under the Brexit Party banner, Farage said he would leave the country to work as a warm-up speaker for Trump's 2020 campaign rallies. In June 2020, Farage was exempted by US officials from the country's travel ban under a "national interest" clause, while Trump prepared for his first major election campaign rally since the COVID-19 pandemic. On 20 June, he posted a picture from the US and was later spotted at the Trump rally, taking part in a "Team Trump on Tour" panel discussion. Farage appeared in the audiences of rallies in states such as Michigan and Pennsylvania. In an Arizona rally on 29 October, Trump called Farage "one of the most powerful men in Europe" and invited him to speak on the stage, where he described Trump as the "most resilient and brave person" he had ever met. After the day of the election, Farage conceded that Trump lost "fair and square", but said "Donald Trump loses the odd battle, but he doesn't lose wars. He keeps fighting until he wins them".

In 2021 Farage undertook a six-week tour of the United States organised by the conservative group FreedomWorks. Entitled America's Comeback Tour, it saw him address Republican grassroots audiences across the country.

Austria

During the 2016 Austrian presidential election campaign, Farage said that Norbert Hofer, the Freedom Party candidate, would call for a "Brexit style referendum" if he won. Hofer, however, ruled out a referendum and asked Farage not to interfere in Austria's internal politics.

France 
Farage initially endorsed Nicolas Dupont-Aignan of Debout la France, another party of the Alliance for Direct Democracy in Europe, and later supported Marine Le Pen of the National Front, for the second round of the 2017 French presidential election. Farage said that the basis for his endorsement of Le Pen was his belief that she would be more sympathetic to the UK following Brexit, in contrast to the pro-European Emmanuel Macron.

Germany
Farage spoke at a rally for the far-right Alternative for Germany party in advance of the 2017 German federal election, having been personally invited by the party's deputy leader Beatrix von Storch.

Ukraine 

Farage said on 24 February 2022 that the 2022 Russian invasion of Ukraine was "A consequence of EU and NATO expansion, which came to a head in 2014. It made no sense to poke the Russian bear with a stick. These are dark days for Europe." His remarks led some commentators to compare him to Lord Haw-Haw, the pro-Hitler broadcaster and propagandist of the 1940s who was subsequently tried and convicted for treason.

Political views

Economy
From taking office as a UKIP MEP in 1999, Farage has often voiced opposition to the "euro project". His argument is that "a one-size-fits-all interest rate" cannot work for countries with structurally different economies, often using the example of Greece and Germany to emphasise contrast.

Farage strongly opposes the use of bailouts and says that "buying your own debt with taxpayers' money" will not solve the problem and that, "if we do, the next debt crisis won't be a country ... it will be the European Central Bank itself".

On the issue of welfare, Farage wants migrants to live in the UK for five years before being able to claim benefits, and for them to be ineligible for tax credits. He believes that tax avoidance is caused by "punitive tax rates", and wants "fairer" taxes as a way to prevent it.

Electoral reform
During the campaigning before the UK voting system referendum of May 2011, which offered the two options of a continuation of first-past-the-post and an alternative vote system, Farage declared himself in favour of the latter, saying that a continuation of first-past-the-post would be a "nightmare" for UKIP, although he also said that AV would make little difference to UKIP's fortunes. The party's stance was decided by its central policy-making committee, although Farage expressed a preference for the AV+ system as it "would retain the constituency link and then also the second ballot ensured there were no wasted votes". After the 2015 general election, in which UKIP took a much lower proportion of seats than votes, Farage called the first-past-the-post voting system (FPTP) "totally bankrupt". He had said in 2011: "I completely lost faith in [FPTP] in 2005 when Blair was returned with a 60 seat majority on 36 per cent of the vote, or 22 per cent if you factor in low turnout."

Environment
In 2013 Farage criticised David Cameron's policy on wind turbines, describing it as covering "Britain in ugly disgusting ghastly windmills". An official energy policy document produced by UKIP while Farage was leader of the party stated that "UKIP strongly supports a clean environment and clean air, stressing that "coal-fired power stations must use clean technology to remove sulphur and nitrogen oxides, particulates and other pollutants". In a speech made to the European parliament on 11 September 2013, Farage cited a news story that the Arctic Sea ice cap had apparently grown from 2012 to 2013, saying that this was evidence of decades "of Euro-federalism combined with an increasing Green obsession", despite this being a minor milestone in a larger trend of sea ice decline. Farage has described climate change as a "scam".

Healthcare
Farage takes an anti-prohibitionist position on recreational drugs. In an April 2014 phone-in interview hosted by The Daily Telegraph he argued that the War on Drugs had been lost "many, many years ago", stating that "I hate drugs, I've never taken them myself, I hope I never do, but I just have a feeling that the criminalisation of all these drugs is actually not really helping British society." He argued in favour of a Royal Commission on drugs, which would explore all avenues as to how to legislate most effectively and deal with their related criminal and public health problems, including the possibility of their legalisation.

In 2013 Farage said that the smoking ban in enclosed public spaces was "silly and illiberal"; he recommended separate smoking areas along the lines of some German states. He said that banning things makes them more attractive to children, and stated that "Obesity is killing more people than smoking, you could ban chip shops, you could ban doughnuts. The point is we are big enough and ugly enough to make our own decisions".

In his 2015 book Farage reflected that, based on his experiences, "the NHS is so over-stretched that if you can afford private health care, you should take it, particularly for diagnostics and preventative medicine. In the NHS, the system is so battered and poorly run that unless you are really lucky, you will fall through the cracks. The NHS is, however, astonishingly good at critical care. But what testicular cancer taught me is that the NHS will probably let you down if you need screening, fast diagnosis and an operation at a time that suits you". He supports reform within the NHS, saying that its resources have become stretched due to increased immigration, and blaming Labour for high costs of new hospitals built through private finance initiatives.

Farage said in 2015 that money which the NHS could have spent on treating taxpayers with serious conditions was instead being spent on recent immigrants with HIV. A YouGov poll found 50 per cent of those taking part supported Farage, with 37 per cent saying that he was scaremongering.

Immigration
Farage has said that he supports Muslim immigrants who integrate to British society, but is against those who are "coming here to take us over", citing John Howard's Australia as a government to emulate in that regard. He told a Channel 4 documentary in 2015 that there is a "fifth column" of Islamic extremists in the United Kingdom. Farage has said that the "basic principle" of Enoch Powell's 'Rivers of blood' speech was correct: "What he was warning about was the large influx of people into an area, that change an area beyond recognition, there is tension," he said."

In a 2014 interview on the LBC radio station, Farage said that he would feel "concerned" if a group of Romanian men moved next door to him. When interviewer James O'Brien inquired what would be the difference between Romanian men moving next door and a group of German children, in reference to Farage's German wife and children, Farage replied: "You know the difference." He later expanded on this on the UKIP website, stating that "if we were able to operate a proper work permit scheme for Romanian nationals, with suitable checks, as recommended by UKIP, then nobody would need to be concerned if a group of Romanian nationals moved in next door to them."

Farage called on the British government in 2013 to accept more refugees from the Syrian Civil War. He later said that those refugees should be of the country's Christian minority, due to the existence of nearer Muslim-majority safe countries. During the ensuing migration crisis, Farage alleged that the majority of people claiming to be refugees were economic migrants, and that some were Islamic State militants.

In an interview in 2014, Farage suggested that people with HIV should be banned from moving to the UK. During the televised debates in advance of the 2015 election, he said that "You can come into Britain from anywhere in the world and get diagnosed with HIV and get the retro-viral drugs that cost up to £25,000 per year per patient... What we need to do is to put the NHS there for British people and families, who in many cases have paid into the system for decades."

In a 2015 interview Farage stated that he had a "slight preference" for immigrants from countries such as India and Australia compared to those from Eastern Europe, as they "are in some ways more likely to speak English, understand common law and have a connection with this country".

Foreign policy
Farage has been highly critical of the wars in Iraq and Afghanistan, saying "Nobody should forget that the most devastating direct consequences of the wars in Iraq and Afghanistan have not been suffered by the likes of Mr Blair, but by the civilian populations of these countries and of course by our own brave service personnel". Farage stated that migrant exodus from Libya had been caused by NATO military intervention, approved by David Cameron and Nicolas Sarkozy, in the civil war in Libya. When the UK Parliament was debating direct military involvement in Syria in 2013, Farage cited the financial and human costs and poor outcomes of the UK involvements in Iraq and Afghanistan as reasons for Britain not to become involved militarily in Syria. He considers rebel forces in Syria to have Islamic extremists among its ranks.

Farage has criticised Britain's close ties with Saudi Arabia. He said: "I think we need a complete re-appraisal of who Saudi Arabia are, what our relationship with them is, and stop extremist talk turning the minds of young, male Muslims in this country." In an interview with Fox News Channel, Farage criticised the West's reluctance to hold Saudi Arabia accountable for the assassination of Jamal Khashoggi and the kingdom's decades-long propagation of radical Wahhabism, while stressing the importance of British and American economic and security ties to the Kingdom.

Farage called French President Emmanuel Macron a "globalist" who wants "many more powers to be centralized in Brussels, powers taken from the member states". Farage accused Erdoğan's Turkey of "blackmailing" the EU over the European migrant crisis and Turkey's proposed European membership. When asked in 2014 which leaders he admired, Farage said, "As an operator, but not as a human being, I would say Putin. The way he played the whole Syria thing. Brilliant. Not that I approve of him politically. How many journalists in jail now?" Later, in 2015, he said about Putin that "The European Union, and the West, view Putin as the devil. They want to view Putin as the devil. I'm not saying I want take him around for tea and meet mum on Sunday afternoon … But the point is, on this bigger overall battle [against ISIS in Syria] we need to start recognizing we're on the same side".

In 2013 he opposed sanctions on Iran, and that he would not support an Israeli strike on Iranian nuclear facilities, stating: "I do not support acts of aggression, even from countries that feel their existence is threatened". In 2018 he condemned Jeremy Corbyn's "record for standing up and defending this hardline Islamist regime" and declared that regime change was "absolutely the right thing" in Iran.

Firearms
In 2014 Farage said that it was UKIP policy for handguns in the UK to be legalised and licensed, describing the current legislation, brought in after the Dunblane school massacre, as "ludicrous". He has also said that there was no link between responsible handgun ownership and gun crime.

LGBT rights
When asked on LBC in 2014, after same-sex marriage was legalised in England and Wales, whether he supported gay marriage, he answered that he does "not support the idea of same-sex marriages, all the while we're under the auspices of the European Court of Human Rights". He added that he would not campaign to abolish same-sex marriage. He also believes that people who oppose same-sex marriage, such as Christian and Muslim communities, should be allowed to speak out about their beliefs.

In 2019 Farage defended Ann Widdecombe, a Brexit Party candidate, for remarks that were perceived to be supportive of gay conversion therapy. Widdecombe had stated that science may one day "produce an answer" to homosexuality. Farage later defended Widdecombe for these remarks, explaining that "these things are a matter of conscience".

Conspiracy theories
In 2014, Farage appeared in an online documentary, Bilderberg: The Movie, alongside a number of conspiracy theorists. In the film he said: "I've tried very hard not to believe in conspiracy theories," but accused the European Union of moving "towards supranationalism", adding: "I've got to know over the years the Van Rompuys, the Schulzes, you know, the Barrosos, even the Junckers, the Timmermans, and it's completely clear, they actually want to destroy the nation state as a unit". According to an investigation by the anti-racism group Hope Not Hate, Farage has retweeted Jack Posobiec, a promoter of the debunked Pizzagate conspiracy theory. A Brexit party spokesman dismissed the findings as "a series of tangential, transient retweets." Farage has appeared alongside conspiracy theorists from the LaRouche movement and InfoWars.

In 2019, Farage described financier George Soros as "the biggest danger to the entire western world" and alleged Soros seeks "to undermine democracy and to fundamentally change the makeup, demographically, of the whole European continent". As Soros is of Jewish descent, the Jewish Community Security Trust said "Nigel Farage should ensure that his language does not help [antisemitic conspiracy theories] to spread in British politics".

Electoral performance

Farage has contested several elections under the UKIP banner and one under the Brexit Party banner:

Broadcasting career

Fox News
On 20 January 2017, the day of Trump's presidential inauguration, US news channel Fox News announced it had hired Farage as a commentator. He has since provided political analysis for both the main Fox News channel and its sister channel Fox Business Network.

LBC
From January 2017 to June 2020 Farage hosted The Nigel Farage Show on the UK talk radio station LBC. The show was broadcast live on Monday to Thursday evenings.

Farage said on his show that Channel 4 journalist Jon Snow "should be attacked" for his "condescending bias" during coverage of a pro-Brexit protest in March 2019. Ofcom decided that Farage had not broken their broadcasting code since he clarified that he meant a verbal attack.

On 31 October 2019, the day the UK was set to leave the European Union before the approval of a delay, Farage interviewed US President Donald Trump on his LBC show. Trump criticised Prime Minister Boris Johnson's Brexit deal, saying it made it difficult for the UK to strike a trade deal with the US.

From March 2018 to July 2018, Farage hosted a podcast under the LBC banner entitled Farage Against The Machine, a play on words for the term 'rage against the machine', where he discussed the latest political developments and political news with political figures who Farage both agrees, and disagrees with. New episodes of the podcast were released every Friday, but the podcast was cancelled after the American rock music band Rage Against the Machine sent a cease and desist letter to Farage, demanding that Farage change the name of the podcast, which he was unwilling to do, prompting LBC to reluctantly trigger its cancellation.

On 11 June 2020, LBC announced that Farage would be leaving the station "with immediate effect", noting that his contract had been up for renewal.

GB News
On 20 June 2021 Farage joined the British news channel GB News to host the Sunday morning political discussion programme The Political Correction. On 17 July 2021 he announced he would begin hosting the Monday to Thursday evening show Farage on 19 July.

Personal life

Farage lives in Single Street, a hamlet in the London Borough of Bromley, "around the corner from his mother". He has been married twice. In 1988 he married Irish nurse Gráinne Hayes, with whom he has two children: Samuel (born 1989) and Thomas (born 1991). The couple divorced in 1997. In 1999 he married Kirsten Mehr, a German national; the couple have two children. In April 2018, Farage said that the children have both British and German passports and that they speak "perfect German". Farage has spoken of how they have been teased because of their relation to him. He has made reference to his German wife in response to criticisms that he is "anti-Europe", while he himself says he is merely anti-EU. Farage has employed his wife Kirsten as his parliamentary secretary and in April 2014 he said that "nobody else could do that job". In February 2017 his wife told the Press Association that they were living "separate lives" and that Farage had "moved out of the family home a while ago".

In a BBC interview with Rachel Johnson in May 2017 he described himself as "53, separated, skint", citing 20 years of campaigning as the reason for both.

On 25 November 1985 Farage was hit by a car after a night out, and suffered injury to his head and left leg, the latter nearly requiring amputation. He was in casts for 11 months but recovered, and the nurse who treated him became his first wife. On 26 December 1986, Farage first felt symptoms of what was later discovered to be testicular cancer. He had the left testicle removed, and the cancer had not spread to any other organs.

In 2010 Farage published a memoir, entitled Fighting Bull (Flying Free in paperback), outlining the founding of UKIP and his personal and political life so far. A second book, The Purple Revolution: The Year That Changed Everything, was released by Biteback Publishing in 2015.

Farage is a keen cricket fan and has appeared on Test Match Special. He appeared in an advertisement for the bookmaker Paddy Power ahead of golf's 2014 Ryder Cup. However, due to spinal injuries since his 2010 plane crash, he cannot play golf. Farage is also an association football fan, and supports Crystal Palace FC. He likes to relax by fishing alone at night on the Kent coast. Farage is a smoker and also fond of beer, this forming part of his public image. Farage is a member of the East India, Devonshire, Sports and Public Schools' Club, a gentlemen's club situated in St. James's Square in London.

Farage is a Christian. In 2014 he described himself as a "somewhat lapsed" member of the Church of England.

In January 2016 Farage told The Mail on Sunday that he believed his car had been tampered with in October 2015, as he had been forced to stop when his car's wheel nuts came loose. He reported that he had spoken with the French police but did not wish to pursue the matter any further. The Times, however, said Farage's story was untrue, and that Dunkirk prosecutors had no reason to suspect foul play or the police would have started an investigation. The owner of the breakdown garage concerned had said the problem was probably shoddy repair work, but he had been unable to communicate directly with Farage. Farage later said he had made a "terrible, terrible mistake" in speaking to journalists and that a Sunday newspaper had misreported his claims of tampering as an assassination attempt.

Awards 
In November 2016 Farage was honoured with the Lifetime Achievement Award for his role in the 2016 Brexit referendum at the 33rd Parliamentarian of the Year awards run by political magazine The Spectator.

In December 2016 he was shortlisted for Time magazine's Person of the Year award.

In February 2020, an honorary doctorate of laws degree was presented to Farage by Jerry Falwell Jr. during Liberty University's weekly convocation for his role in Brexit and 'support of freedom' in Europe and the United States.

See also
 Brexit: The Uncivil War, a 2019 film in which Nigel Farage is played by Paul Ryan
 The Farage Garage, a nickname given to the Customs clearance facility and lorry park being developed near Sevington, Kent (near Dover).

Notes

References

Bibliography
 Fighting Bull. Biteback (autobiography 2010 hardback first edition). .
 Flying Free. Biteback (autobiography 2011 paperback second edition). .
 The Purple Revolution: The Year That Changed Everything. Biteback (memoir 2015 paperback). .

External links

 
 MEP website
 Nigel Farage Profile at European Parliament website
 UKIP MEPs Official website of the UK Independence Party in the European Parliament
 Europe of Freedom and Democracy Political group in the European Parliament
 Debrett's People of Today
 
 2002 Amnesty law
 Penal Code, articles L133-9, L133-10, L133-11

 
1964 births
Living people
20th-century Anglicans
21st-century Anglicans
Brexit
British broadcaster-politicians
British political party founders
Conservatism in the United Kingdom
Critics of Islamism
Critics of multiculturalism
English Anglicans
English autobiographers
English commodities traders
English libertarians
English people of German descent
Leaders of the UK Independence Party
MEPs for England 1999–2004
MEPs for England 2004–2009
MEPs for England 2009–2014
MEPs for England 2014–2019
MEPs for England 2019–2020
People associated with Russian interference in the 2016 United States elections
People educated at Dulwich College
People from Bromley
Survivors of aviation accidents or incidents
UK Independence Party MEPs
Brexit Party MEPs
GB News
GB News newsreaders and journalists
Right-wing populism in the United Kingdom
English nationalists
British monarchists